The United States established official relations with Nepal in 1947 and opened its Kathmandu embassy in 1959. Relations between the two countries have always been friendly. U.S. policy objectives toward Nepal center on helping Nepal build a "peaceful, prosperous, and democratic society."

According to the 2012 U.S. Global Leadership Report, 41% of Nepalese people approve of U.S. leadership, with 12% disapproving and 47% uncertain. As of 2012, Nepalese students form the 11th largest group of international students studying in the United States, representing 1.3% of all foreigners pursuing higher education in America.

History

Since 1951, the United States has provided more than $791 million in bilateral economic assistance to Nepal.  In recent years, annual bilateral U.S. economic assistance through the U.S. Agency for International Development (USAID) has averaged $40 million. USAID supports agriculture, health, family planning, environmental protection, democratization, governance, and hydropower development efforts in Nepal. USAID had also supported Nepal's peace process, as well as its preparation for Constituent Assembly elections. The United States also contributes to international institutions and private voluntary organizations working in Nepal. To date, U.S. contributions to multilateral organizations working in Nepal approach an additional $725 million, including humanitarian assistance. The Peace Corps temporarily suspended its operations in Nepal in 2004 due to increasing security concerns and officially terminated its Nepal program in 2006.

Ambassador Randy W. Berry was appointed to Nepal on October 25, 2018.  He replaces Alaina B. Teplitz, who is now the United States Ambassador to Sri Lanka and the Maldives.

Principal U.S. Officials include:
 Ambassador – Randy W. Berry
 Deputy Chief of Mission – Patricia A. Mahoney
 Counselor for Management Affairs – Katelyn M. Choe
 USAID Director – David Atteberry
 Political and Economic Chief – Michael B. Goldman
 Consular Chief – Patrick McNeil
 Public Affairs Officer – Susan Parker-Burns
 Regional Security Officer – Karen A. Lass
 Regional Environment Officer – Tracy A. Hall
 Political/Military Chief – Kevin Costanzi
 Defense Attaché – COL Gregory Winston
 Office of Defense Cooperation – MAJ Dawood A. Luqman

See also
 Foreign relations of Nepal
 Foreign relations of the United States
 Nepalese Americans

References

External links
 History of Nepal - U.S. relations

 
United States
Bilateral relations of the United States